Christopher Vincent Kinahan, Sr. (born 23 March 1957) better known as Christy 'the Dapper Don' Kinahan; is an Irish drug dealer with convictions for ecstasy and heroin smuggling.

Biography
The Guardian newspaper states that Christy Kinahan was born in St Teresa's Gardens, Dublin, in the south inner city, though an Irish passport cited by the U.S. Office of Foreign Assets Control (OFAC) lists his primary place of birth as Cabra, Dublin further north. The OFAC also note that he uses a British passport stating his place of birth as Perivale. The Irish Independent states that his father was a dairy farm manager.

He was arrested for crimes related to the seizure of heroin in Marino in the 1980s and served a six-year jail sentence. He studied for two degrees whilst in prison. While inside, he refused early release to complete a degree. As well, while in prison he learned to speak both Spanish and Russian.
He is suspected of setting up drug routes into Western Europe for Mexican and Colombian cartels, and the Russian mafia.

His home was raided by Spanish police in 2010, though no charges were brought.

His ex-wife lived in Dublin and died in 2015. His son Daniel is a boxing promoter, lives in a villa in Guadalmina and allegedly runs the day-to-day aspects of his father's gang. He was probably the main target of the Regency Hotel shooting. His son Christopher Jr is also involved in boxing.

Other associates
John Cunningham served 17 years for kidnapping Jennifer Guinness.

Hutch-Kinahan feud
 
Gary Hutch was blamed for an attempt on Daniel Kinahan's life, so the Kinahans ordered him to be shot. He was murdered in Málaga in late 2015.
Gary Hutch was the nephew of Gerry 'The Monk' Hutch, the most successful  armed robber in Ireland, and the Monk is said to have taken the murder very personally, refusing any attempt at a 'sit down' made by the Kinahans.

In January 2016, in an event that received international media attention, hitmen working for the Monk dressed up as Gardaí before attacking a boxing weigh-in at the Regency Hotel in North Dublin. It is believed they were aiming for Christy Kinahan's son Daniel, who was in attendance at the weigh-in.

On New Year's Eve 2015, gunmen associated with Kinahan are believed to have targeted Gerry 'The Monk' Hutch at a pub in Lanzarote. Hutch had, however, already left the bar.

Other events

By February 2010 Kinahan was awaiting sentence in Belgium on money laundering charges. 
He is believed, by UK detectives, to have laundered drug-dealing profits by funding 27 fixed horse races between December 2002 and August 2004. As a result of the alleged conspiracy, jockeys Kieren Fallon, Darren Williams and Fergal Lynch, faced criminal horse race-fixing charges at the Old Bailey.

In March 2016 Julio Martinez, the chief prosecutor for the Marbella area, told El País that charges against Kinahan for money laundering were imminent. Christy Kinahan already has convictions for money laundering in Ireland, the Netherlands and Belgium.

He is a suspect in six murders, including the father and uncle of Jamie Kavanagh in 2014 and 2015.

In September 2020 Spanish authorities charged Kinahan with passport fraud.

In April 2022 the Office of Foreign Assets Control of the United States Department of the Treasury imposed sanctions on Christy Kinahan, his sons Daniel and brother Christy Jr. as well as several associates of the Kinahan family. The OFAC notice refers to the family and its associates collectively as the "Kinahan Organized Crime Group" or "KOCG."

The addition to SDN List blocks any property of the designated persons within the United States financial system, and prohibits United States persons from business dealings with them. Violations of the sanctions, including assisting in their evasion, come with a maximum criminal penalty of twenty years imprisonment.

On 12 April 2022, the United States Department of State announced the offering of rewards of up to $5 million USD under the Narcotics Rewards Program for information leading to the arrest and/or conviction of the Kinahan family members. The reward is offered jointly with the Garda Síochána, National Crime Agency, and Drug Enforcement Administration.

See also
Thomas Kavanagh

References

Irish gangsters
Criminals from Dublin (city)
Living people
Year of birth uncertain
Place of birth missing (living people)
1956 births
People convicted of money laundering
Irish drug traffickers
People charged with fraud
Kinahan Organised Crime Group
Specially Designated Nationals and Blocked Persons List